Massimiliano Sabbatani (born 4 August 1975 in Forlì, Italy) is a former Grand Prix motorcycle road racer. 125 cc European Champion in 1998.

Career statistics

Grand Prix motorcycle racing

Races by year
(key) (Races in bold indicate pole position, races in italics indicate fastest lap)

External links 
 Max Sabbatani – Motogp.com

1975 births
Living people
Italian motorcycle racers
125cc World Championship riders
250cc World Championship riders
People from Forlì
Sportspeople from the Province of Forlì-Cesena